Oil is a Christian thrash metal band from Long Beach, California, USA. The band was formed in 1997 by Ron Rinehart, the former vocalist with Dark Angel, who converted to Christianity at a Harvest Crusade after Dark Angel's dissolution in 1992. Other members include lead guitarist Blake Nelson (formerly with Deceiver, Desire and Captain Black) and drummer Jason Vander Pal. Oil has released two studio albums and one live album.

In 2004, Rinehart left the band to pursue other non-musical interests. The rest of the group is looking for a new vocalist.

Biography
Oil's first release was a self-financed EP in 1999.

The Refine album was well-reviewed for its honest, no-frills metal approach. The band performed live gigs, including a show at the Stryper Expo, but Rinehart received an injury soon after the album release which meant Oil did not perform for nearly a year. Once recovered, Rinehart and Oil returned to performing, being announced as special guests to Disciple in April.

The band recorded the live album Choice Cuts Off the Chopping Block at the First Baptist Church in Downey, California, in November 2002. The record included two new acoustic songs, "This Is My Prayer" and "Medicine Man". When bass guitarist Matthew Joy opted out in May 2003, Oil recruited Jonathan Thiemens of Blind Sacrifices as a temporary replacement. This became permanent in July.

In July 2004, Oil announced that they were to disband. The group undertook one last show on August 14 alongside Recon, East West, Trauma and Terrestrial Harvest at The Lighthouse in Long Beach.

Blake Nelson of Oil is now in the band Blake Nelson's BLAKENSTEIN.  Blakenstein's new album 13th Hour was to be released in early 2014.

Discography

Studio albums
 Oil (1997)
 Refine (2000)
 13th Hour (2014)

Live albums
 Choice Cuts Off the Chopping Block (2003)

Compilations
Temporary Insanity: A Salute to Deliverance (on tracks Attack and Screaming)

Notes

External links
Review of Refine at The Phantom Tollbooth

Thrash metal musical groups from California
Musical groups from Los Angeles
Musical groups established in 1997
Musical groups disestablished in 2004
American Christian metal musical groups